Stammen is a surname of Dutch origin. Notable people with the surname include:

Craig Stammen (born 1984), American baseball player
Keven Stammen (born 1985), American poker player

References

Surnames of Dutch origin